Del Negro may refer to:
Andalò del Negro, mediaeval Italian astronomer
Vinny Del Negro, American basketball player and coach
Matthew Del Negro, American actor
Del Negro (actor), Spanish actor

See also
 Negro (surname)
 Negro (disambiguation)

Italian-language surnames
Spanish-language surnames